Suman Datta is an Indian born American engineer. He is the Fellow of the Institute of Electrical and Electronics Engineers and the Stinson Endowed Chair Professor at the University of Notre Dame since 2016. Prior to that, he was a Full Professor at Penn State University from 2007 to 2016, and Principal Engineer at Intel Corporation from 1999 to 2007.

Education 
He studied at South Point High School, Kolkata. He received his bachelor's degree in Electrical Engineering at the Indian Institute of Technology, Kanpur, India, in 1995. He received his PhD in Electrical and Computer Engineering from the University of Cincinnati, Ohio, USA, in 1999.

Career 
From 1999 till 2007, he was with the Components Research division at Intel Corporation in Hillsboro, Oregon. He was a Principal Engineer in the Advanced Transistor and Nanotechnology Group at Intel. He was a member of the Intel transistor R&D team that pioneered several generations of advanced logic transistor technologies such as high-k/metal gate CMOS, non-planar Tri-gate CMOS, and strained Si/SiGe channel CMOS. He has also led many novel transistor research programs including compound semiconductor based MOSFET and Tunnel FETs. More recently, his research team has investigated phase transition solid-state devices to implement continuous-time dynamical systems and explore their applications in solving hard optimization problems in computer science.

He was a Professor of Electrical Engineering at the Penn State University from 2007 to 2015. In 2013, he was named Fellow of the Institute of Electrical and Electronics Engineers (IEEE) in 2013 for his contributions to high-performance advanced silicon and compound semiconductor transistor technologies. In 2016, he was named Fellow of the National Academy of Inventors in recognition of his inventions that have made a tangible impact on quality of life, economic development and the welfare of society.

As of February 2022, he has nearly 700 publications in different journals, conferences and granted patents and 28,400 citations.

Personal life: He is married to Anjuli Datta and have two children, Rajeev and Tanya.

References 

Fellow Members of the IEEE
Living people
Place of birth missing (living people)
Intel people
American people of Indian descent
1973 births
American electrical engineers